Neal Anderson Phillips (born 20 January 1956) is a former Barbadian first-class cricketer.

Phillips was born at Holder's Hill in the parish of Saint James, Barbados. He made his debut for Barbados in a List A one-day match against Guyana in April 1979 in the Geddes Grant/Harrison Line Trophy, with Phillips featuring in a further match in that years competition. He played minor counties cricket for Staffordshire in England in the summer of 1981. Having not featured for Barbados since his two initial one-day matches in 1979, Phillips made a return to the Barbadian side, returning to one-day action in the 1982/83 Geddes Grant/Harrison Line Trophy. 

He made his debut in first-class cricket in January 1983 against the Leeward Islands in the Shell Shield. He continued to play first-class and List A one-day cricket for Barbados until the 1984/85 season, having by that point played a total of 15 first-class and eight List A matches for Barbados. He scored 350 runs in first-class cricket, with a highest score of 51; bowling he took 39 wickets at an average of 29.33, though he did not take a five wicket haul, his best bowling figures were 4/35. In List A matches he scored 139 runs, with a top score of 47; however, he had less impact as a bowler in the one-day game, taking just three wickets. Following his retirement from first-class cricket, Phillips became a groundsman.

References

External links
Neal Phillips at ESPNcricinfo
Neal Phillips at CricketArchive

1956 births
Living people
People from Saint James, Barbados
Barbadian cricketers
Barbados cricketers
Staffordshire cricketers